Jameel Humaidan is the current Minister of Labor and Social Development of Bahrain.

Current positions 
 Minister of Labour and Social Development since September 30, 2015, upon Royal Decree No. (65) 2015.
 Minister of Labour February 26, 2011 – September 2015, upon Royal Decree No. (14) 2011, and Royal Decree No. (38) 2014.
 Board Chairman, Labour Market Regulatory Authority (LMRA).
 Board Chairman, Family Bank.
 Chairman, Occupational Health and Safety Council.
 Head of Quartet Committee for Expatriate Labour Mobility.
 Head of Joint Committee for Evaluating Repercussions of the Economic Crises and its Impact on National Labour.
 Head of Committee for Reviewing the Status of Illegal Workers.
 Head of Talented and Outstanding Workers’ Ceremony Committee.
 Head of National Committee for Childhood.
 Board Chairman, High Council for Vocational Training (February 2011 – October 2015).

Membership in boards, councils and committees 
 Board Member, Economic Development Board (EDB).
 Board of Trustees Member, University of Bahrain.
 Member, Civil Service Council.
 Member, Civil Defense Council.
 Member, Education and Training Reform Committee.
 Member of the Ministerial Committee for Finance and Economic Affairs.
 Member of the Ministerial Committee for Legal Affairs.
 Member of the Ministerial Committee for Social Services, Communication and Information.
 Member of the Ministerial Committee for Infrastructure and services 2011–2014.

Regional and international memberships 
 Boards Member, International Labour Organization (ILO), since June 2014.
 Member, GCC Labour and Social Affairs Ministers’ Council.
 Vice President, the 16th Asia and the Pacific Regional Meeting, Bali, Indonesia.
 Chairman, GCC Insurance Against Unemployment team since June 2012.
 Chairman, GCC Labour Ministers’ Council 30th session, 2013.
 Board Chairman, Arab Labour Organization in 2011.
 Member, Social Insurance Expertise Committee for providing social insurance for GCC nationals working in Gulf countries.
 General Coordinator, The Standard Gulf Directory For Occupational Classification and Standardization.

Arab and international participations 
 Represented His Royal Highness Prince Khalifa Bin Salman Al Khalifa, Bahrain Prime Minister in the United Nations Security Council's Conference on Human Trafficking, New York (December 20, 2016).
 Represents the Kingdom of Bahrain in the annual conferences of the ILO, the Arab Labour Organization (ALO), and a number of other related Arab and international organization's meetings and conferences.
 Headed a number of joint committees on the Arab and GCC countries level.

Major accomplishments 
Participated in establishing the new Bahrain Labour Law for Private Sector, issued in 2012.
Issued a number of Ministerial Decrees regulating the Labour Law with direct impact on enhancing labour rights and unions’ activities in Bahrain.
Launched many pioneer initiatives and projects in the field of Training and employment, such as the National Labour Market Observatory, the Occupational Standards Project, Graduates Employment Project, Hospitality Institute Project.
Supervised and prepared a number of labour studies and programs in the GCC.
Former Member of the Editorial Committee for Social and Labour Studies Publications.
Received His Majesty the King's "Medal of Bahrain", (National Day, December 16, 2016).
Received His Majesty the King's Medal of the First Class Efficiency as one of the pioneer national workers (National Day, December 16, 2009).

References

King Hamad drops four ministers

External links
 About 7,000 Bahrainis Unemployed with 85% Females - Labour Minister

Bahraini politicians
Government ministers of Bahrain
Living people
Bahraini Shia Muslims
Year of birth missing (living people)